Hugo Sinzheimer (12 April 1875 – 16 September 1945) was a German legal scholar and contributed to the writing of the Weimar Constitution. He was a leading proponent of the concept of social law.

Biography
Sinzheimer was one of the first academics specialising in labour law; he published an introduction to this field (Der korporative Arbeitsnormenvertrag) in 1907. He was one of the members of the Weimar National Assembly, which promulgated the Weimar Constitution. As a major influence on the drafting of the labour law section of the constitution, he is considered to be "the father of labour law" in Germany. He was inspired by the ideals of the dignity and liberty of every human being, and was a humanist in the widest sense of the word.

As a lawyer, he frequently represented political and union-related groups. He joined the Social Democratic Party of Germany in 1914. From 1920 onward, he was professor of labour law and sociology of law at Frankfurt University.

In 1933, Sinzheimer, who was Jewish, was forced to emigrate to the Netherlands. In 1940 he was captured and taken to the Theresienstadt concentration camp for four months. He managed to secure release, and had to return to hiding in the attic of friends in the Netherlands. After the liberation of the Netherlands in May 1945 he was exhausted and severely malnourished. He did not recover from his poor health and died several months later in September 1945.

Legacy
The Sinzheimer Institute of the University of Amsterdam's Law Department is named after him in his honour.

There is a moot court competition named after Sinzheimer. 13 European universities compete in an annual case competition - the Hugo Sinzheimer Moot Court Competition. The Moot Court Competition is a competition in European Labour Law for law students across Europe.

Archival material relating to Hugo Sinzheimer's professional activity as a labour lawyer and professor is held by the Leo Baeck Institute in New York.

A more extended biography is to be found at the Sinzheimer Repository website

A complete list of Hugo Sinzheimer's publications is to be found at the Sinzheimer Repository website

Publications
Lohn und Aufrechnung. Ein Beitrag zur Lehre vom gewerblichen Arbeitsvertrag auf reichsrechtlicher Grundlage (Diss. Univ. Heidelberg, Berlin 1902)
Der korporative Arbeitsnormenvertrag (1907)
Brauchen wir ein Arbeitstarifgesetz? Rechtsfragen des Tarifvertrags (1913)
Ein Arbeitstarifgesetz. Die Idee der sozialen Selbstbestimmung im Recht (1916)
Grundzüge des Arbeitsrechts (1921)
Der Kampf um das neue Arbeitsrecht (1924) Die Arbeit
Das Problem des Menschen im Recht (1933)
Jüdische Klassiker der deutschen Rechtswissenschaft (1938).
Theorie der Gesetzgebung. Die Idee der Evolution im Recht (1949 postum)
Otto Kahn-Freund und Thilo Ramm, Arbeitsrecht und Rechtsoziologie. Gesammelte Aufsätze und Reden (Europäische Verlagsanstalt 1976) 2 volumes

See also

 European labour law
 German labour law
 United Kingdom labour law

References

Further reading

External links
www.sinzheimer.net
Hugo Sinzheimer Institute for Labour Law website, based in Frankfurt (est 2010)
University of Amsterdam, Department of Law's Sinzheimer Institute

1875 births
1945 deaths
People from Worms, Germany
People from Rhenish Hesse
Social Democratic Party of Germany politicians
Members of the Weimar National Assembly
Jurists from Hesse
Jewish emigrants from Nazi Germany to the Netherlands